Cornelia Rickert (born 30 July 1954) is a German former volleyball player who played the outside hitter position. She competed in the women's tournament at the 1976 Summer Olympics.

References

External links
 

1954 births
Living people
German women's volleyball players
Olympic volleyball players of East Germany
Volleyball players at the 1976 Summer Olympics
Sportspeople from Mecklenburg-Western Pomerania
People from Rostock (district)